The 1930 Columbia Lions football team was an American football team that represented Columbia University as an independent during the 1930 college football season. The team compiled a 5–4 record and outscored opponents  with four shutouts. The team played its home games at Baker Field in Upper Manhattan.

In December 1929, Lou Little was hired as Columbia's head football coach, effective in the fall of 1930. He had been the football coach at Georgetown for five years.

Schedule

References

Columbia
Columbia Lions football seasons
Columbia Lions football